The 1890 Kansas Jayhawks football team represented the University of Kansas as an independent during the 1890 college football season. In their first season of existence, the Jayhawks had no official coach. Starting center Will Coleman served as an unofficial coach for the team. In just three games of the season, the Jayhawks offense scored 33 points while the defense allowed 52 points and ended with a record of one win and two losses.  This was the first season for Kansas Jayhawks football and the first game against Baker marked the first time college football was played in the state of Kansas. The Jayhawks' 14–12 victory over Baker on December 8, was the first victory in the program's history.

Schedule

References

Kansas
Kansas Jayhawks football seasons
Kansas Jayhawks football